David Michael Dellucci (born October 31, 1973) is an American former professional baseball outfielder, who played 13 seasons in Major League Baseball (MLB) for seven teams.

High school
Dellucci graduated from Catholic High in Baton Rouge, Louisiana in 1991. He earned the team's Most Valuable Player honors in both baseball and football, and All-State honors for baseball. He was also awarded the Catholic High Man of the Year award as a senior in 1991. During the winter of 2001, he was inducted into the Catholic High School Hall of Fame as a Grizzly Great.

College
Dellucci played four seasons at the University of Mississippi (Ole Miss), where he was an All-Southeastern Conference (SEC) selection in both 1994 and 1995 and earned All-American status in 1995, setting 10 school records and winning the SEC batting title in hitting. He was named Athlete of the Year at Ole Miss in 1995. Dellucci was elected into the Ole Miss "M Club" Athletic Hall of Fame in 2010 and was named as one of the 50 Greatest Athletes in Ole Miss history.

Career
In spite of playing well and racking up solid statistics as a college player, Dellucci was viewed by MLB Central Scouting as a utility outfielder when compared to the thick talent pool of other players in the '95 draft. As a result, he did not rate a high pick, and he went in the 10th round and was eventually selected by the Baltimore Orioles in that year's First-Year Player Draft. In 1997, Dellucci recorded his first Major League hit off of Tom Gordon, which hit off of the Green Monster in Fenway Park. He hit his first major league home run on June 25 in a road game against Cal Eldred of the Brewers. 
While playing in the Arizona Fall league for the Phoenix Desert Dogs he was selected by the Arizona Diamondbacks in the 1998 MLB Expansion Draft. He played for Arizona from the team's inaugural season in 1998 to 2003. He led the National League with 12 triples in 1998 and played on the World Series-winning squad in 2001.

However, in 1998, as a rookie, and as he found his rhythm in major league baseball, he led the National League in triples. While hitting .394 in June, 1999 he was diagnosed with a degenerative bone in his left wrist called Kienböck's disease. In honor of Dellucci, each Diamondback player and coach displayed his number on the side of their caps. Initially the injury was diagnosed to be career ending but he after a successful reconstructive surgery and extensive rehabilitation, he returned to make the team out of spring training in 2000.

During the 2001 season, Dellucci hit 10 home runs in 217 at bats with 6 of the home runs coming as a utility player and pinch hitter. 
Just before the trade deadline in the 2003 season, Dellucci was traded to the New York Yankees, along with pitcher Bret Prinz and catcher John Sprowl, in exchange for outfielder Raúl Mondesí. He finished the 2003 season as a member of the American League Champion Yankees and appeared in the World Series against the Florida Marlins.

In 2004, Dellucci signed with the Texas Rangers as a free agent. In 331 at bats, Dellucci hit 17 home runs along with 61 RBI. During the Rangers playoff run, Dellucci hit a game winning double to beat the Oakland A's and keep the Rangers in playoff hopes alive. It has been described as one of the most memorable plays in Texas Rangers history.

In 2005, Dellucci had one of his best years as a professional. He recorded a season high in total at bats (435), along with homers (29) and RBIs (65). He is tied for second in Ranger history with 4 lead off home runs.

Until the trade of Bobby Abreau, Dellucci was used mostly as a pinch hitter/reserve outfielder but still hit .292 with 13 home runs in 264 at bats.
Dellucci signed with the Cleveland Indians on December 6, 2006.

On June 19, 2007, while running to first base, Dellucci severely tore his left hamstring tendon off the bone just under his left knee. He missed time early in Spring training 2009 due to a surgically repaired thumb after smashing it in the tailgate of his trailer. Dellucci started the 2009 season on the disabled list with a strained left calf. While hitting .275 in 40 at bats, he was designated for assignment by the Indians on May 29, 2009, and after clearing waivers, was released on June 1.

On June 10, 2009, Dellucci agreed to terms on a minor league contract with the Blue Jays. He did well (.317 BA) at their AAA affiliate, the Las Vegas 51's of the Pacific Coast League. This led to the Blue Jays purchasing Dellucci's contract, on July 3. After a brief stint with the big league club in Toronto, he was designated for assignment, on July 24, 2009 due to poor play. Electing not to accept his designation he was released on July 31, 2009 by the Las Vegas 51s, the Triple-A affiliate of the Blue Jays. Dellucci did not return to playing, and chose to retire.

Career after baseball

Dellucci is a color commentator for Sports South, ESPN3, Atlantic Sun TV and CST. 

He is also on the National Wildlife Federation's Vanishing Paradise advisory board.

In 2011, Dellucci was inducted into the Louisiana American Italian Hall of Fame.

Charity

Dellucci has worked with several charities such as Easter Seals, Special Olympics, Children with AIDS foundation and Make a Wish foundation. 

He is also on the Board of Directors for the Miracle League of Baton Rouge.

In 2005 after hurricanes Katrina and Rita he formed his own charity called Catch22forblue in which he raised and personally distributed money for individuals, groups and schools which were affected by the tragedy along from Southeast Texas to Gulfport, Mississippi.

He received a Commendation from the Louisiana House of Representatives and was recognized by the state Senate for his efforts.

Dellucci's Dream Foundation gave free baseball camps and clinics for boys and girls in Louisiana.

Personal

Dellucci is married to The Price is Right model Rachel Reynolds and has appeared on three episodes of The Price is Right with her; the first was for an engagement episode in 2010 in which he modeled a tuxedo, the second announcing the couple's first pregnancy in September 2012, and the third in February 2018 for Valentine's Day. The couple welcomed their first child, Ruby Rae, on February 13, 2013.

See also

 List of Major League Baseball annual triples leaders

References

External links

1973 births
Living people
American people of Italian descent
American expatriate baseball players in Canada
Arizona Diamondbacks players
Arizona League Diamondbacks players
Baltimore Orioles players
Baseball players from Baton Rouge, Louisiana
Bluefield Orioles players
Bowie Baysox players
College baseball announcers in the United States
Cleveland Indians players
Columbus Clippers players
Frederick Keys players
Las Vegas 51s players
Major League Baseball outfielders
New York Yankees players
Ole Miss Rebels baseball players
Philadelphia Phillies players
Texas Rangers players
Toronto Blue Jays players
Tucson Sidewinders players
South Bend Silver Hawks players
Catholic High School (Baton Rouge, Louisiana) alumni